The Krüper is a German breed of creeper chicken. It originates in the former Dutchy of Berg, now the Bergisches Land in western Germany, and is one of three chicken breeds from that area, the others being the Bergische Kräher and the Bergische Schlotterkamm. It belongs to the group of original European creeper breeds. The breed has normal-sized and bantam varieties.

History 
The first description of the breed is found in the "Avium Natura" of Conrad Gesner from 1555. These chickens have often been found in the former Dutchy of Berg (now "Bergisches Land"), but also in Westfalia and Saxony. After the near-extinction of the French "Courtes-Pattes", this breed could be reconstructed by crossing local French chickens with krupers. The bantam variety, which also had become extinct, has been rebred by crossbreeding with German bantams.

Characteristics 
The most typical feature of the Krüper is the reduced length of the legs, measuring 7-10 cm. The cock weights max. 2.25 kg, the hen 1.5-2.0 kg. The comb is single, the earlobes white and round. The body is long and cylindrical. The legs are slate grey. The eggs are white-coloured. The kruper is known in black, white, cuckoo, silver, gold and partridge. The bantams can be found in white and silver duckwing plumage. The silver and gold animals have a typical broad feather lacing called "Dobbelung", which only occurs in the three Berg chicken breeds.

Occurrence 
The Krüper belongs to the endangered German breeds. A census in Germany in 2013 resulted in a number of 288 hens and 79 cocks, including all varieties. In 2001 the breed was chosen to be "endangered breed of the year" by the Gesellschaft zur Erhaltung alter und gefährdeter Haustierrassen, in combination with the other Berg chicken breeds. Sperm of some cocks has therefore been cryo-conserved by the Bruno-Dürigen Institute as a genetic reserve.

Clubs 
In Germany the Sonderverein der Krüper- und Zwergkrüperzüchter has been founded in 1904 in Düsseldorf in order to organize the breeders. In the Netherlands the breed is represented by the breeders of the Nederlandse speciaalclub voor Duitse hoenderrassen (Dutch club for German chicken breeds).

References

External links 
 Website of the Nederlandse speciaalclub voor Duitse hoenderrassen (Dutch club for German chicken breeds), accessed May 2019
 Website of the Sonderverein der Krüper- und Zwergkrüperzüchter von 1904 (German Club of creeper breeders), accessed May 2019

Chicken breeds
Creeper chickens